Ali Nawaz Jung Bahadur formula also known as Nawaz Jung formula or Jung formula is a civil engineering formula used in hydrological constructions. The formula is derived mainly for the catchment of the reveres and ungauged basins for different regions.

 The formula Q=C(0.368A)(0.925 - log0.386A / 14 )

References

Indian civil engineers
Indian Muslims
Scientists from Hyderabad, India
Engineers from Telangana